Evelyn Mok (born 29 November 1987) is a Swedish-born Chinese stand-up comedian and actress.

Early life
Mok was born in Sweden to a Chinese immigrant family. Her father came from British Hong Kong, and her mother is Chinese and grew up in India. Mok jokes that she identified as Indian until she was ten.

Career

Mok began performing stand-up in Sweden and later went to England's University of Roehampton as part of the Erasmus Programme. She was a finalist at the Chortle Awards in 2013 and described Andy Kaufman, Demetri Martin and Tony Law as her favourite comics. Comedy Central (Sweden) referred to her as "the Swedish Amy Schumer". Mok has performed at every Edinburgh Fringe since 2013.

Mok has appeared on Mock the Week, Hypothetical, Heresy, Off Menu with Ed Gamble and James Acaster and Sam Delaney's News Thing, and has also appeared on Swedish TV.

As an actress, Mok has appeared in Spider-Man: Far From Home, I Hate Suzie and The Reluctant Landlord.

From April 2019 to October 2021, she hosted Rice to Meet You, a comedy podcast, with Malaysian comedian Nigel Ng. The final episode, # 130, Hiatus, stated reasons to take a hiatus from the podcast included creative and professional differences to preserve the personal friendship between Mok and Ng.

Personal life
In 2021, in Hisingen, Gothenburg, Mok was subject to a racist attack.

References

External links

English women comedians
Swedish stand-up comedians
Living people
English people of Chinese descent
Swedish people of Hong Kong descent
1987 births
Alumni of the Erasmus Programme
21st-century Swedish actresses
21st-century English actresses
Swedish people of Chinese descent